The Boston University-Maine men's ice hockey rivalry is a college hockey rivalry between the Boston University Terriers and the Maine Black Bears in the Hockey East conference. The rivalry was born out of fierce on-ice competition between the two schools, especially in the 1990s and early 2000s, as the two schools were routinely at the top of the Hockey East standings and battled each other for conference supremacy.

History

In the early years of Maine's program, the rivalry was one-sided and had not yet truly formed, as Boston University dominated Maine on the ice, defeating them 13 consecutive times between 1982 and 1986, one of the worst losing streaks to a single opponent in Maine's history. Once legendary Black Bears coach Shawn Walsh took over the program, however, the tides started to turn, and Maine began to make up ground. One notable meeting between the teams occurred on February 19, 1993, at Alfond Arena in Orono, home of the Black Bears. Maine was in the midst of an unprecedentedly successful season, having entered that contest with a record of 30-0-2. Midway through the third period, Maine was leading by a score of 6-2, and it appeared they would cruise to another easy victory. However, the Terriers would rally, and manage to score four unanswered third period goals to tie the game at 6-6 and send it to overtime. In the overtime period, Terriers forward Mike Prendergast would get a breakaway from center ice and proceed to score the game-winning goal for the Terriers, giving them a stunning 7-6 victory and handing Maine their first loss of the season. Prendergast would say after the game, "My sister could have scored that goal" to taunt the Maine players and fans. However, this would end up as Maine's only loss the entire season, as they would not lose another game all season and win their first national title with a stunning 42-1-2 record, including defeating the Terriers twice more by a combined score of 11-3. Boston University would have their revenge, however, winning a national championship of their own in 1995, defeating Maine in the national title game 6-2. The on-ice rivalry between the schools was often overshadowed by the personal rivalry between the coaches, Walsh for Maine and BU's own legendary coach Jack Parker. Both men were impassioned and bombastic coaches, and as such drew the ire of each other and of opposing fans. While they often had choice words for each other during their coaching careers, Parker spoke kindly of Walsh during his cancer treatment and following his 2001 death. While some fans view Boston College and New Hampshire as BU and Maine's historical and primary rivals, respectively, fans from the heat of the rivalry in the 1990s and early 2000s may report that in their opinion, either Maine or BU is their schools true rival, not UNH or BC. Even after Walsh's 2001 death, the rivalry has remained heated and competitive, meeting in the Hockey East playoff tournament in 2002, 2004, 2009, 2010, and 2012, with Maine winning each matchup aside from 2009. The two teams also met in the NCAA National Tournament in 2002, with Maine emerging victorious. On January 24, 2004, the two teams combined for 268 penalty minutes in one game, a men's college hockey record that stands to this day, and stood as the all-levels, both genders record until 2013. The majority of the penalty minutes were accrued during a brawl at the end of the game, which was a 1-0 victory for Boston University. Even as Maine's team performance has declined in the latter part of the 2010s, games between the teams remain tense, chippy affairs, and simultaneous success for the teams would lead to a rejuvenation of the once-heated rivalry.

Game Results

As of July 19, 2021 

† Hockey East Tournament 
†† Hockey East Championship Game 
††† NCAA Tournament 
†††† NCAA National Championship Game

Results by decade

References

College ice hockey rivalries in the United States
Boston University Terriers men's ice hockey
Maine Black Bears men's ice hockey